The 2003 Auto Club 500 was a NASCAR Winston Cup Series stock car race held on April 27, 2003, at California Speedway in Fontana, California. Contested over 250 laps on the 2-mile (3.23 km) asphalt D-shaped oval, it was the tenth race of the 2003 NASCAR Winston Cup Series season. Steve Park of DEI won the pole.  Kurt Busch of Roush Racing won the race. This was also the last race for Jerry Nadeau. His career ended with an injury during practice at Richmond

Background
The track's turns are banked from fourteen degrees, while the front stretch, the location of the finish line, is banked at eleven degrees. Unlike the front stretch, the backstraightaway is banked at three degrees.

Top 10 results

References

Auto Club 500
Auto Club 500
NASCAR races at Auto Club Speedway
April 2003 sports events in the United States